Ciarán Potts is a former professional rugby union player. He was forced to retire prematurely due to injury in 2006. He played for Leinster Rugby and was seen as a bright prospect. A particular strength of his game was his ability as a line-out option in the backrow, given his large height for his position (6 feet 6 inches, or 1.98 m).

References

Leinster Rugby players
1982 births
Living people